Maixiu (Mandarin: 麦秀镇) is a town in Zêkog County, Huangnan Tibetan Autonomous Prefecture, Qinghai, China. In 2010, Maixiu had a total population of 11,139: 5,530 males and 5,609 females: 3,576 aged under 14, 6,918 aged between 15 and 65 and 645 aged over 65.

References 

Huangnan Tibetan Autonomous Prefecture
Township-level divisions of Qinghai
Towns in China